Symphony X is the first studio album by progressive metal band Symphony X, originally released in 1994 through Zero Corporation in Japan, and reissued in 1996 through Inside Out Music in Europe; a remastered edition was reissued on January 13, 2004 through Inside Out Music. The album's release came about as a result of band guitarist Michael Romeo's 1994 solo album, The Dark Chapter, achieving success in Japan. It is the only Symphony X album to feature singer Rod Tyler, who would be replaced by Russell Allen on all subsequent works.

Critical reception

Robert Taylor at AllMusic gave Symphony X 1.5 stars out of 5, noting the predominant Yngwie Malmsteen influences throughout the music, and calling the album "Humble beginnings for what was to become a very original and influential band."

Track listing

Personnel
Rod Tyler – vocals
Michael Romeo – guitar
Michael Pinnella – keyboard
Jason Rullo – drums
Thomas Miller – bass
Technical personnel
Mike Thompson – engineering, mixing
Joseph M. Palmaccio – mastering

References

External links
Symphony X at symphonyx.com
In Review: Symphony X "Symphony X" at Guitar Nine Records

Symphony X albums
1994 debut albums
Inside Out Music albums